Natalie Coleman is a British chef and winner of the 2013 series of MasterChef.
 She is now the head chef of The Oyster Shed in London and won Best Pub Chef at the 2022 Great British Pub Awards.

Career
Since winning MasterChef, she was appointed to oversee the menu of a new restaurant Hello Darling which opened next to the Old Vic Theatre in May 2019.

Natalie went to Chingford Foundation School in north east London. The same school that David Beckham, Harry Kane and Dwight Gayle attended.

Natalie has worked stages at some of the most well known restaurants in the UK including Le Gavroche (Michel Roux Jr), Viajante (Nuno Mendes), St Johns (Fergus Henderson), The Kitchin (Tom Kitchin), L’enclume (Simon Rogan), The Berkeley Hotel (Marcus Wareing), Midsummer House (Daniel Clifford) and The Hand & Flowers (Tom Kerridge).

She has been Head Chef at The Oyster Shed in the City of London since November 2021. In 2022 she won Best Pub Chef  at the Great British Pub Awards.

Publications
 Winning Recipes: For Every Day (2014)

Coleman has also co-authored:
 MasterChef the Finalists cookbook with fellow MasterChef runners-up Dale Williams and Larkin Cen, (2014) 
 MasterChef Ordinary to Extraordinary (2018)

References

External links

1983 births
British chefs
English television chefs
Living people
People from the London Borough of Hackney
Reality cooking competition winners
Women chefs